Yehoshua Bar-Yosef (b. 29 May 1912 d. 7 October 1992) was an Israeli writer.

Bar-Yosef was born in Safed, Ottoman Empire and was raised in a Haredi Jewish family. He later left Orthodox Judaism, and became a writer. He worked first as a newspaper editor, and then as a freelance journalist. His work includes novels, novellas, short stories, plays and historical epics about Safed. He received numerous literary awards, including the Bialik Prize in 1984.

Books published in Hebrew
The Voice of Passion (stories), Kiryat Sefer, 1937; Gazit, 1939 [Kol Ha-Yetzarim]
A Whole Month (play), Mishkan, 1938 [Yerah Yamim]
The Fallen Barrier (novella), Gazit, 1940 [Homah She-Naflah]
Mother of Daughters (novel), Massada/Bialik Institute, 1943; Ma`ariv 1988 [Em Ha-Banot]
The Alleys of Jerusalem (play), Achiasaf, 1941 [Be-Simataot Yerushalayim]
A Meeting in Spring, Twersky, 1947 [Pegisha Ba-Aviv]
A Boy in the Street (story), Hakibbutz Hameuachad, 1945 [Yeled Ba-Rechov]
From a Mother`s Body (stories), Adi, 1945 [Me-Gufa Shel Em]
Stories from Me`ah She`arim, Ofer, 1946 [Me-Sipurei Meah Shearim]
The New House (stories), Sifriat Poalim, 1946 [Ha-Bait Ha-Hadash]
My Husband, the Minister (play), Twersky, 1950 [Ba`ali Ha-Minister]
Magic City (novel), Twersky, 1949 [Ir Kesumah]
Hakibbutz Hameuchad, 1979
On the Threshold (novel), Twersky, 1953 [Ha-Omdim Al Ha-Saf]
Sword of Salvation (novel), Ministry of Defense, 1966 [Herev Yieshuit]
Tabernacle of Peace (novel), Am Oved, 1958; Ma`ariv, 1988 [Sukat Shalom]
Ma`ariv, 1988
The Three that Left (novel), Massada, 1963 [Shlosha She-Azvu]
People of Beit Rimon (stories), Amichai, 1958; Ma`ariv 1988 [Anshei Bait Rimon]
The Secret of a Woman (stories), Am Oved, 1957 [Sodah Shel Ishah]
The Way to the Red Rock (stories), The Author, 1959 [Ba-Derech La-Sela Ha—Adom]
Upon Thy Walls, O Jerusalem (play), Renaissance, 1967 [Al Homotaich Yerushalayim]
Between Safed and Jerusalem (autobiography), Bialik Institute, 1972; Ma`ariv, 1992 [Ben Tzfat L`Yerushalayim]
Soul Mate (novella), Hakibbutz Hameuchad, 1979 [Ahavat Nefesh]
The Fourth Photograph (novel), Yachdav, 1980; Ma`ariv, 1991 [Ha-Photograph Ha-Revi`i]
A Guide for Confused Patriots (non-fiction), Hadar, 1984 [Moreh Derech Le-Patriotim Nevochim]
Tales of Safed, Tales of Jerusalem (stories), Keter, 1984 [Mi-Sipurei Tzfat, Mi-Sipurei Yerushalayim]
A Heretic Despite Himself (novel), Keter, 1985 [Apikores Beal Korho]
Let There Be Light (stories), Hadar, 1985 [Va-Yehi Or]
Three Ways (novel), Keter, 1986 [Be-Shalosh Drachim]
The Infant from Bar`am (novel), Hadar, 1987 [Ha-Yenuka Mi-Bar`am]
A Hungry Man`s Tale (stories), Ma`ariv, 1988 [Sipuro Shel Adam Raev]
On The Way Back (novel), Keter, 1988 [Ba-Derech Hazarah]
The Fish and the Dove (novel), Ma`ariv, 1989 [Ha-Dag Ve-Ha-Yonah]
Utopia in Blue and White (novel), Ma`ariv, 1990 [Utopia Be-Kahol Lavan]
Burnt Matches (novel), Ma`ariv, 1991 [Gafrurim Serufim]
Seed of Everlasting Life (novel), Ma`ariv, 1992 [Zera Shel Kiama]
Parchment and Flesh (novel), Ma`ariv, 1993 [Gevilim U-Besarim]

Performed plays
Guardians of the Walls [Ohel-1948]
My Husband the Minister [Hamatateh-1950]
Vote For Agassi [Hamatateh-1950]
It Happened in Tel Aviv [Hamateteh-1951]
Saturday in Tiberias [Hamatateh-1952]
Laugh Beloved Land [Hamatateh-1954]
Until One Hundred and Ninety [Hamatateh-1966]
Peace, Peace, But There Is No Peace [Habimah-1973]

Books in translation
Hissda Goes Up the Mountain, English: New York, World Zionist Organization, 1972
Soul Mate, Italian: Florence, Giuntina, 1999; reprint forthcoming

References

Israeli writers
People from Safed
1912 births
1992 deaths